A spoonbill is a large, long-legged wading bird in the family Threskiornithidae.

Spoonbill may also refer to:

 Spoonbill catfish, a primitive Chondrostean ray-finned fish
 USS Spoonbill (MSC-202), a Bluebird-class motor minesweeper
 The Spoonbills, a "secret army" of innkeepers and peasants in John Buchan's novel Midwinter
 Shoveler, four species of dabbling ducks with long, broad spatula-shaped beaks

See also

 Spoon-billed

Animal common name disambiguation pages